Michael Lewis Sabin (born 24 September 1968) is a former police officer, drug educator and New Zealand politician. He is a member of the National Party and was a member of the House of Representatives from 2011 to 2015. He is the father of former 3 News political reporter Brook Sabin.

Personal
Sabin was raised and schooled in Whangarei.

Sabin wrote a book called The Long Way Home after his son Darryl received a brain injury playing rugby in 2009. The book is about Darryl's injury and the challenges the family overcame working towards his recovery. His son is now a motivational speaker.

Career
Sabin was first employed as a Seaman Officer in the Royal New Zealand Navy in the 1980s. After leaving the Navy, Sabin worked in the dairy industry before joining the Police in the 1990s. In 2006, he founded MethCon Group, a company that supplies drug education. He sold the company in October 2010.   He also played a role in the establishment of drug courts in New Zealand by inviting American judge Peggy Hora to talk about how drug courts operate in the United States.

In 2008, Sabin received a Sir Peter Blake Emerging Leader Award.

Member of Parliament

Resignation
In December 2014 New Zealand media reported that Sabin was under investigation by police over an assault complaint. The reports were not confirmed by the New Zealand Police, Prime Minister John Key or Sabin himself. Sabin resigned from Parliament on 30 January 2015 with immediate effect "due to personal issues that were best dealt with outside Parliament." Key subsequently revealed that he had considered appointing Sabin as a minister when the National Party was re-elected in 2014.

Sabin's resignation forced a by-election in the Northland electorate.

Post Parliament
In  April 2015 Sabin started working at Peppers Carrington Resort in Karikari, recently bought by Chinese firm Shanghai CRED with plans to greatly expand it.

References

1968 births
Living people
New Zealand National Party MPs
People from Whangārei
New Zealand police officers
Members of the New Zealand House of Representatives
New Zealand MPs for North Island electorates
21st-century New Zealand politicians